Wang Phrong is a sub-district in the Noen Maprang District of Phitsanulok Province, Thailand.

Geography
The sub-district lies within the Nan Basin, which is part of the Chao Phraya Watershed.

Administration
The following is a list of the sub-district's mubans, which roughly correspond to villages:

References

Tambon of Phitsanulok province
Populated places in Phitsanulok province